{{DISPLAYTITLE:C15H28O2}}
The molecular formula C15H28O2 (molar mass: 240.387 g/mol, exact mass: 240.2089 u) may refer to:

 Cyclopentadecanolide
 Menthyl isovalerate, or validolum

Molecular formulas